Bay Shore, Washington was a small community located on Oakland Bay in southern Puget Sound, not far away from the present city of Shelton, Washington.

References
 Findlay, Jean Cammon, and Paterson, Robin, Mosquito Fleet of South Puget Sound, Arcadia Publishing (2008) .

Geography of Mason County, Washington